Richard "Richy" Jackson is an American dancer, creative director, and choreographer from the San Francisco Bay Area best known for his work with Lady Gaga. Jackson has a lifelong interest in dance, and after seeing school friend Aaliyah on television, he left Tuskegee University in 1999 and moved to Los Angeles to pursue dance as a career.

Jackson has danced for several artists including Missy Elliott and Usher, and was an assistant choreographer to award-winning choreographer Michael Rooney. Jackson later worked as an assistant choreographer to Laurieann Gibson, choreographing, collaborating, and dancing with Lady Gaga as well as for artists including Cimorelli, Keri Hilson, Brandy, Katy Perry, Nicki Minaj, and Sean "Puffy" Combs. In November 2011, Lady Gaga ended her professional relationship with Gibson and appointed Jackson as her choreographer and visual director.

In 2012 Jackson served as visual director and choreographer for Lady Gaga's Born This Way Ball tour and featured as a judge on Lifetime television's Abby's Ultimate Dance Competition.  Jackson also has dance credits in several films and television commercials.

Jackson is known to his fans as "Richy Squirrel" and is an active Twitter contributor.

Music videos

Choreography

 2004 – Kimberley Locke – "8th World Wonder"
 2004 – Mis-Teeq – "One Night Stand"
 2005 – JoJo – "Not That Kinda Girl"
 2005 – JoJo – "Leave (Get Out)"
 2008 – Lady Gaga – "Just Dance"
 2008 – Lady Gaga – "Beautiful, Dirty, Rich"
 2008 – Lady Gaga – "Poker Face"
 2009 – Lady Gaga – "LoveGame"
 2009 – Lady Gaga – "Paparazzi"
 2009 – Lady Gaga – "Bad Romance"
 2010 – Lady Gaga – "Telephone"
 2010 – Lady Gaga – "Alejandro"
 2010 – Katy Perry – "California Gurls"
 2010 – Keri Hilson – "The Way You Love Me"
 2010 – Keri Hilson – "Pretty Girl Rock"
 2011 – Lady Gaga – "Born This Way"
 2011 – Lady Gaga – "Judas"
 2011 – Keri Hilson – "Lose Control"
 2011 – JoJo – "The Other Chick"
 2011 – Cimorelli – "Million Bucks"
 2011 – Lady Gaga – "Yoü and I"
 2011 – Lady Gaga – "Marry the Night"
 2012 – Karmin – "Brokenhearted"
 2012-13 – Lady Gaga – Born This Way Ball
 2013 – Priyanka – "In My City"
 2013 – Priyanka – "Exotic"
 2013 – Karmin – "Acapella"
 2013 – Lady Gaga – "Applause"
 2013 – Krewella – Get Wet Tour
 2013 – Lady Gaga – iTunes Festival
 2013 – Lady Gaga – ArtRAVE
 2013 – Lady Gaga – Jingle Bell Ball
 2013 – To Be One – "Do You"
 2014 – Lady Gaga - "G.U.Y."
 2014 – Lady Gaga - Lady Gaga Live at Roseland Ballroom
 2014 – Lady Gaga - ArtRave: The Artpop Ball
 2017 – Lady Gaga - "John Wayne"
 2017 – Lady Gaga - Coachella Valley Music and Arts Festival
 2017 – Lady Gaga - Joanne World Tour
 2020 - Lady Gaga - "Stupid Love"
 2020 - Lady Gaga - "Rain On Me"
 2020 - Lady Gaga - "911"

As a dancer

 2001 – *NSYNC – "Pop"
 2001 – Blu Cantrell – "Hit 'Em Up Style (Oops!)"
 2001 – Usher – "U-Turn"
 2002 – JC Chasez – "Blowin' Me Up (With Her Love)"
 2003 – Missy Elliott – "Gossip Folks"
 2008 – Lady Gaga – "Beautiful, Dirty, Rich"
 2008 - Lady Gaga - "Love Game"
 2009 – Lady Gaga – "Paparazzi"
 2010 – Lady Gaga – "Telephone"
 2010 – Keri Hilson – "Pretty Girl Rock"
 2011 – Lady Gaga – "Born This Way"
 2011 – Lady Gaga – "Judas"

Filmography

Film
 2003 – Honey – assistant choreographer
 2003 – Malibu's Most Wanted – assistant choreographer
 2004 – You Got Served – dancer
 2004 – A Cinderella Story – dancer
 2004 – Fat Albert – dancer
 2009 – Alvin and the Chipmunks: The Squeakquel – Chipmunk dancer
 2018 – A Star Is Born – choreographer

Television
 2003-2005 – Making the Band – multiple on-camera appearances
 2009 – 2009 MTV Video Music Awards – dancer
 2011 – The Dance Scene – series regular
 2011 – Born to Dance – series regular
 2012-2013 – Abby's Ultimate Dance Competition – judge
 2013 – 2013 MTV Video Music Awards – choreographer for Lady Gaga
 2013 – Lady Gaga and the Muppets Holiday Spectacular – visual producer and choreographer

References

External links
 Official website
 

Living people
1979 births
African-American choreographers
American choreographers
African-American male dancers
People from San Francisco
21st-century African-American people
20th-century African-American people